Jeffrey Roger Kanew (born December 16, 1944) is an American film director, screenwriter, film producer and film editor who early in his career made trailers for many films of the 1970s and is probably best known for directing the film Revenge of the Nerds (1984) and for editing Ordinary People.

Kanew directed Gotcha! (1985) and Tough Guys (1986), the final film pairing actors Kirk Douglas and Burt Lancaster, having initially directed Douglas in 1983's Eddie Macon's Run. His other directorial efforts include Troop Beverly Hills starring Shelley Long, V.I. Warshawski starring Kathleen Turner, Natural Enemies starring Hal Holbrook and Louise Fletcher, Babij Jar, a Holocaust drama, National Lampoon's Adam & Eve, several TV episodes, and for the stage and video versions of the Kirk Douglas one-man show "Before I Forget" (2009).

Kanew also directed the documentary Black Rodeo (1972), capturing the events surrounding the first ever performance of an all-black rodeo at Triborough Stadium on Randall's Island, N.Y.

Kanew's son Justin Kanew is a reality show contestant from season 15 and season 18 of The Amazing Race. Justin was also the Democratic candidate for Congress in Tennessee's 7th District in the 2018 midterm election.

References

External links 

American film directors
American male screenwriters
American film producers
American film editors
1944 births
Living people
Comedy film directors